Giuseppe Francesco (Pino) Italiano  (born 16 March 1961) is an Italian computer scientist. He is a professor of computer science at LUISS University in Rome. He is known for his work in  graph algorithms, data structures and algorithm engineering.

Education and career
He received his laurea summa cum laude in electrical engineering from Sapienza University of Rome in 1986, and a PhD in computer science from Columbia University in 1991.

He was research staff member (1991-1996) at the IBM Thomas J. Watson Research Center and a full professor of computer science at the University of Salerno (1994-1995), at the Ca' Foscari University of Venice (1995-1998), and at the University of Rome Tor Vergata (1998-2018), where he was department chair from 2004 to 2012. Since 2018 he is professor of computer science at LUISS University.

From 2008 to 2014, Italiano was editor-in-chief of the ACM Journal of Experimental Algorithmics.

Awards and honors
In 2016 Italiano was named an EATCS Fellow for his "fundamental contributions to the design and analysis of algorithms for solving theoretical and applied problems in graphs and massive data sets, and for his role in establishing the field of algorithm engineering".

Selected publications
.
.
.
.
 .

References

External links

1961 births
Living people
Italian computer scientists
Theoretical computer scientists
Sapienza University of Rome alumni
Columbia University alumni
Academic staff of the University of Salerno
Academic staff of the Ca' Foscari University of Venice
Academic staff of the University of Rome Tor Vergata
Academic staff of the Libera Università Internazionale degli Studi Sociali Guido Carli